Jackson's Coppice and Marsh is a nature reserve of the Staffordshire Wildlife Trust.

Description
The reserve, area , is leased from the Sugnall Estate. It lies along the River Sow; Offleybrook Mill is upstream and Walk Mill is downstream. In the 13th century, a dam at Walk Mill raised the water level of the marsh, and until the 1950s the fields were managed as water-meadows. After the 1970s, when Walk Mill fell into disuse, the mill pond became silted up; the pond has since been restored.

Marsh
There is a boardwalk leading through an alder carr, a wet woodland of alder. The River Sow is split here into a number of narrow channels. It is a habitat for particular species of plant and insects; dragonflies and damselflies may be seen.

Jackson's Coppice
The wood, which has been coppiced in the past, has been long established, originally with oak, rowan and hazel. It is thought that the sweet chestnut, beech and hornbeam were planted in the late 19th century. The coppice has a notable display of blubells in the spring. The sandy soil has encouraged a large badger sett. Several species of woodland birds may be seen, such as nuthatch, treecreeper and great spotted woodpecker.

References

Nature reserves in Staffordshire
Forests and woodlands of Staffordshire
Marshes of England
Ancient woods in England
Alder carrs